The Ane River is a river that flows through the northern part of Shiga Prefecture, Japan, entering Lake Biwa at the city of Nagahama.

References

See also 

 Battle of Anegawa

Rivers of Shiga Prefecture